The Roman Catholic Diocese of Bayombong (Lat: Dioecesis Bayombongensis) is a Roman Rite diocese of the Latin Church of the Catholic Church in the Philippines. Its seat is the Bayombong Cathedral.

History
Erected in November 7, 1966, as the territorial prelature of Bayombong, the prelature was elevated to a full diocese in November 1982. The diocese is a suffragan of the Archdiocese of Tuguegarao.

After the resignation of Bishop Villena in 2016, Pope Francis appointed Sofronio Aguirre Bancud, SSS, DD, Bishop of Cabanatuan as Apostolic Administrator while he selected a new bishop. On May 24, 2018, the Pope appointed Jose Elmer I. Mangalinao, DD, Auxiliary Bishop of Lingayen-Dagupan as the Third Bishop of the Diocese of Bayombong.

Ordinaries

See also
Catholic Church in the Philippines
List of Catholic dioceses in the Philippines

References

Bayombong
Dioceses established in the 20th century
Religious organizations established in the 1960s
Religion in Nueva Vizcaya